The New Caledonia Super Ligue 2017 is the 44th season of top-tier Caledonian football. It started on 18 March 2017. Twelve teams take part in the championship.

The top two teams of the league, Hienghène Sport and AS Magenta, qualified for the 2019 OFC Champions League.

Standings
Note: 4 points for a win, 2 points for a draw, 1 point for a defeat.

References

New Caledonia Super Ligue seasons
New
2017 in New Caledonian sport